Alexander Markin may refer to:

 Aleksandr Markin (footballer) (1949–1996), Soviet Russian football player
 Aleksandr Markin (hurdler) (born 1962), Soviet hurdler